Edenburg is a census-designated place in Windsor Township, Berks County, Pennsylvania, United States.  It is located along Old Route 22, and very close to I-78, approximately two miles from Hamburg.  As of the 2010 census, the population was 681 residents.

Demographics

References

Populated places in Berks County, Pennsylvania